2018 Shenzhen Open – Doubles may refer to:

2018 ATP Shenzhen Open – Doubles
2018 WTA Shenzhen Open – Doubles

See also 

2018 Shenzhen Open (disambiguation)